Gummadi Narsaiah is an Indian politician and leading member of Communist Party of India (Marxist–Leninist) New Democracy. He was a member of the Legislative Assembly for Yellandu between 1983-1994 and 1999-2009, elected as an Independent. He has earned a reputation among members in the constituency as a people's man. Narsaiah was defeated by the Telugu Desam Party candidate Vooke Abbaiah in 2009 Assembly elections.

In 2000 Narsaiah was a leader in a movement against rising electricity tariff rates and more recently in demonstrations for forestry rights. Parameshwar Hivrale is Directing a biopic on Gummadi Narsaiah. It is based on the lifestyle of Gummadi Narsaiah and it will release at the end of 2023.

Publications
"An Open Letter to Chief Minister over the Atrocities on the Tribals Committed by the State's Police"), published in February 1986.

References

External links
Constituency profile
"An Open Letter to Chief Minister over the Atrocities of the Tribals Committed by the State's Police", 

Year of birth missing (living people)
Living people
Telangana politicians
Telangana MLAs 2014–2018